Livade is a village in the municipality of Danilovgrad, Montenegro.

Demographics
According to the 2011 census, its population was 160.

References

Populated places in Danilovgrad Municipality